Laslo Đere (born 2 June 1995) is a Serbian professional tennis player. On 10 June 2019, Đere reached his career-high singles ranking of world No. 27. On 22 March 2021, he reached his career-high at world No. 346 in the doubles rankings.
He has won two ATP Tour singles titles, one an ATP 500 Series event in Rio in 2019, after which he made the break-through into top 30, and the inaugural Forte Village Sardegna Open in 2020, an ATP 250 event. Đere debuted on the ATP Tour at the 2013 PTT Thailand Open, where he was a wildcard. His first qualification attempt to play in the main draw at any Grand Slam was at the 2015 French Open, but his first successful attempt and main draw debut happened at the 2016 French Open. At 2018 US Open, he recorded his first Grand Slam win, defeating Leonardo Mayer in first round.

Early life and background 
Laslo Đere was born on 2 June 1995 to mother Hajnalka and father Csaba (or Čaba) in Senta, Serbia. Both of his parents passed away from cancer. He is a member of the Hungarian community in Serbia.
Đere began playing tennis at age 5 with his father. He also has one sister named Judit. He is fluent in Serbian, English, and Hungarian. His favorite surface is clay. His idols growing up were Andy Roddick, Lleyton Hewitt and Novak Djokovic. He is a supporter of the Chicago Bulls (NBA) and Seattle Seahawks (NFL).

Junior career
On the junior tour, Đere won five singles titles in 10 finals (one final was canceled), while in doubles he won two titles in as many finals. In December 2012, he reached the finals in back-to-back tournaments at Eddie Herr and Orange Bowl, losing the first one (Grade 1 event) 6–0, 4–6, 5–7 to Cristian Garín despite leading 6–0, 4–1, but winning the latter more prestigious event (Grade A) over Elias Ymer 6–4, 6–4. This came after the recent passing of his mother Hajnalka. In May 2013, he played in the final of another Grade A event, Trofeo Bonfiglio, but lost to Alexander Zverev 6–7(5), 7–5, 5–7. Nevertheless, he reached a career-high combined ranking of No. 3 on 27 May 2013.

Junior Grand Slam results – Singles:

 Australian Open: 1R (2013)
 French Open: 3R (2013)
 Wimbledon: QF (2013)
 US Open: –

Junior Grand Slam results – Doubles:

 Australian Open: 2R (2013)
 French Open: 2R (2012, 2013)
 Wimbledon: 2R (2013)
 US Open: –

Professional tour

2013–2016: ATP debut, French Open debut, top 200

Đere started 2013 season, playing mainly at Futures. In July 2013, he won Serbia F6 Futures in Kikinda, winning over Teodor-Dacian Crăciun in the final. Month later, he won another Futures at Serbia F7 in Zlatibor. In September 2013, he made his ATP main draw debut at the 2013 PTT Thailand Open where he received entry to the main draw as a wildcard entrant. In the first round he lost to sixth seed Feliciano López. By the end of year, he was runner–up at two Futures in Cyprus.

In 2014, Laslo played only at Futures, as well as two unsuccessful attempt at Challengers. At Prosperita Open in Ostrava, he lost in third round of qualification, losing from Marek Michalička. In May, he won Croatia F8 Futures in Bol, defeating Mike Urbanija in final. Week later, he won another Futures in Bosnia&Herzegovina (F2) in Prijedor. At Vicenza International, he lost in third round of qualification, losing from Zhang Ze. In September, he won Serbia F13 Futures in Niš. His last tournament of 2014 season was in December, at Senegal F2 Futures in Dakar, where he had success, and won title, winning against Aldin Šetkić in final.

Laslo started 2015 season successfully, playing in the semifinal of Morocco Tennis Tour – Casablanca, where Javier Martí stopped him to reach his first Challenger final. In late January, he won Egypt F3 Futures in Cairo, defeating Kamil Majchrzak in straight-sets. At Dubai Tennis Championships, he made his first attempt to play at some ATP 500 Series event, but failed in the second round of qualification, losing from Lucas Pouille. At French Open, he played in qualification, trying to reach his first main-draw at any grand-slams, but lost in the first round from Nikoloz Basilashvili. In June 2015, in the final of Czech Open challenger tournament in Prostějov, he lost to No. 2 seed Jiří Veselý (ranked No. 41 at the time), while beating three other top 80 players on his way to the final, No. 1 seed Martin Kližan, No. 6 seed Dušan Lajović, and No. 7 seed João Souza, respectively. After that result, on June 8, he debuted in top 200, reaching place of 182. He also reached the quarterfinal at Aspria Tennis Cup in Milan. At US Open, he failed to reach the main-draw, losing in first round of qualification from Mathias Bourgue. By the end of the year, he played quarterfinal at Morocco Tennis Tour – Casablanca II, and semifinal at Sparkassen ATP Challenger in Ortisei.

In May 2016, he played in a Grand Slam main draw for the first time after getting through the qualifying draw at the French Open. He reached two challenger finals during the summer of 2016.

2017–2018: Breakthrough in singles, top 100

In January, Đere played at Australian Open qualification, but lost in second round from Ivan Dodig, missing his chance to debut in main-draw there. Later, he won title at Croatia F4 Futures in Opatija, defeating Zdeněk Kolář in final. In April 2017, Đere recorded his first ATP main draw win at the Grand Prix Hassan II over Martin Kližan, before losing to second seed Albert Ramos Viñolas. At his next tournament, the Hungarian Open, he reached his first ATP semifinal after defeating the likes of Daniil Medvedev, Viktor Troicki and Fernando Verdasco, before being defeated by Aljaž Bedene. He followed this with a quarterfinal at Istanbul Open, where he was defeated by Troicki. At French Open, he lost in second round of qualification from Oscar Otte. Following the successes on the ATP level, he played in challengers during the summer, winning one (2017 Internazionali di Perugia) and reaching three other finals, which enabled him to break the top 100 for the first time on 24 July 2017 at No. 91. In September, Đere made his Davis Cup debut for Serbia in their 2017 semifinal clash against France, losing in straight sets to Jo-Wilfried Tsonga. In November, he played his first ATP Masters 1000 qualification, but wasn't good enough to beat Filip Krajinović in the second round, and qualify to main-draw. He finished the year ranked No. 88.

In January, Đere finally debuted in main-draw at Australian Open, playing in first round against Ivo Karlović, but didn't make it to the second round. He had his ATP Masters 1000 debut at the 2018 BNP Paribas Open, where he was defeated by Tim Smyczek. He reached two ATP semifinals in 2018, Istanbul Open in May and Swiss Open Gstaad in July, where he defeated Borna Ćorić among others. He recorded his first Grand Slam main draw win by defeating Leonardo Mayer at the US Open, before losing to Richard Gasquet in the second round when he failed to convert all 12 of his break point opportunities. He next played a home tie against India in the Davis Cup World Group Play-offs, where he defeated Ramkumar Ramanathan in the opener for his first career win in a Davis Cup match and Serbia eventually won the tie 4–0. On 24 September 2018, after making semifinal at Sibiu Open, Đere reached a then-career high of world No. 83 on 24 September 2018, that in the same time was his highest ranking until 2019.

2019: First ATP title, French Open third round, top 30 debut

In February, Đere won his first ATP title at the Rio Open, defeating Dominic Thiem in the process for the first top 10 win of his career and reached a then-career high ranking of No. 37. During the trophy presentation in Rio, Đere dedicated the title to his late parents in an emotional speech. This title, helped him enter the top 50 for the first time, climbing to World No. 37. After that he made the semifinal at 2019 Brasil Open in São Paulo, losing from Guido Pella.

He next played in Indian Wells, where he was seeded for the first time in his career in an ATP event (despite being a wildcard entrant), receiving a first round bye and then defeating Guido Andreozzi for his first Masters 1000 win, before being defeated by countryman Miomir Kecmanović in the third round, his best career showing at a Masters 1000 level. A semifinal at the Hungarian Open saw him climb to a career high of world No. 29. 
He next reached the third round of Madrid Masters, where he defeated Juan Martín del Potro for his second top 10 win, before losing to Marin Čilić. Winning only one match at the Rome Masters (lost in round two to Basilashvili), coupled with a few withdrawals proved to be enough for Đere to be seeded at a Grand Slam for the first time in his career.

At the French Open, he was seeded 31st, and had his best Grand Slam result so far. He reached the third round, winning against Albert Ramos Viñolas and Alexei Popyrin, in first two round, before he lost from Kei Nishikori in third round.

2020: Second ATP tour title
In October, Djere won the inaugural Forte Village Sardegna Open by beating home favorite Marco Cecchinato in straight sets in the finals.

2021: Sardegna Open final and second French Open third round
In April, he reached the final of Sardegna Open where he lost in three tight sets against home favorite Lorenzo Sonego.

Đere reached the third round of a Grand Slam for a second time at the 2021 French Open where he was defeated by sixth seed Alexander Zverev.

2022: Monte Carlo Masters third round and Winston Salem Open final
At the 2022 Monte-Carlo Masters he reached the third round for the first time at this Masters and only the third time in his career at this level. He defeated Maxime Cressy, 16th seed Lorenzo Sonego in straight sets before losing to third seed and eventual champion Stefanos Tsitsipas.

At the 2022 Winston-Salem Open he reached his fourth ATP tour final defeating David Goffin, 16th seed Joao Sousa, qualifier Jason Kubler, Richard Gasquet and qualifier Marc-Andrea Huesler after needing 9 match points to win.

2023: Top 3 win
In January, Djere beat fifth seed Alex Molcan in the first round of Tata Open Maharashtra, before losing in the round of 16 to Maximilian Marterer. After that, he reached the quarterfinals of ASB Classic by beating Jaume Munar in the first round and world No. 3, who was No. 1 seed, Casper Ruud in the second round, before losing in the quarterfinal in three tight sets against Constant Lestienne after having had a match point in the second set.
In the first round of the Australian Open, he won against Zizou Bergs, his first win at this Major, before losing to Grigor Dimitrov in the next round.

In February, at Argentina Open he won the first round in straight sets against Fabio Fognini, before losing in the round of 16 in three sets to top seed Carlos Alcaraz.

After that, he reached the quarterfinals of Chile Open by beating Joao Sousa in the first round and Riccardo Bonadio in the round of 16, winning both matches in straight sets. In the quarterfinal, he lost to the No. 3 seed Sebastian Baez.

Performance timelines

Singles
Current through the 2023 Indian Wells.

ATP career finals

Singles: 4 (2 titles, 2 runner-ups)

ATP Challenger Tour and ITF Futures finals

Singles: 24 (11 titles, 13 runner–ups)

Doubles: 1 (1 runner–up)

ITF Junior Tour

ITF Junior Circuit Category GA finals

Singles: 2 (1 titles, 1 runner-up)

Record against other players

Record against top 10 players

Đere's match record against those who have been ranked in the top 10, with those who is active in boldface.

Top 10 wins
He has a 3–13 record against players who were, at the time the match was played, ranked in the top 10.

National and international representation

Davis Cup: 3 (1–2)

   indicates the outcome of the Davis Cup match followed by the score, date, place of event, the zonal classification and its phase, and the court surface.

See also 

Serbia Davis Cup team
Sport in Serbia
Fastest recorded tennis serves

Notes

References

External links

 
 
 

1995 births
Living people
Serbian male tennis players
Hungarians in Vojvodina
People from Senta